B D Behring (born 1 March 1946) is an Indian politician from Manipur belonging to the Janata Dal party.

He was elected to the Rajya Sabha for the term, 10 April 1990 to 9 April 1996 from Manipur. However he resigned immediately.

He has been elected to the Manipur Legislative Assembly from Chandel constituency, during 1990-1995 and 2000-2005.

He resides at Khambathel Village near Sugnu.

References

External links
 Rajya Sabha Member, Manipur

Rajya Sabha members from Manipur
Living people
1946 births
People from Chandel district
Janata Dal politicians
People from Thoubal district
Manipur politicians
Manipur MLAs 1990–1995
Manipur MLAs 2000–2002
Naga people